This Thangal of Agastheeswaram was the second among the Primary Nizhal Thangals. This Thangal was constructed by Velandi Vathiyar of Agastheeswaram who was a friend of Sakadevan Citar, one among the five disciples of Vaikundar. He earned his name Vathiyar because he conducted platform-school to educate poor children. He along with other devotees, with carol songs, carries Ayya in a cradle to Agastheeswaram from Chettikudiyiruppu. 

There Ayya blessed many people guilt-conscience who were once tried to scare and chase Vaikundar who was then on his  'Desa-sanjara'  (travel from place to place). He also redeemed them using Patham and Namam. Then he laid stone for the second Thangal. Then a structure was raised there with palm-leaves and Ukappadippu and Ucchippadippu was conducted regularly. A man named  'Sukkirar'  accepted that he will be in charge of lighting the lamp daily. So it was also called Sukkirar pathi.

See also

 Pathi
 Nizhal Thangal
 Worship centers of Ayyavazhi

References

 K. Amalan, Ayya Vaikundar Punitha Varlaru, Akilam Pathippakam, 2000.
 G. Patrick, Religion and Subaltern Agency, University of Madras, 2003.

Nizhal Thangals